Eyes of Innocence is the first album released by Irish singer Brídín Brennan. It consists of a wide selection of original songs, while the hit song "You Can't Hurt Me" has a sample of Glen Campbell's "By the Time I Get to Phoenix". The album produced two hit songs.

Track listing
 "Face to Face"
 "You Can't Hurt Me"
 "Hang On"
 "Where's Your Love"
 "Got What You Wanted"
 "Deep Deep Sleep"
 "It's Too Late"
 "Breakdown"
 "Power of Three"
 "Another Day"
 "Don't Go"

Clannad
2005 debut albums